The Blade Show is an annual tradeshow for the cutlery industry. It is the largest event of its type in the world. The show is owned by Caribou Media Group and is hosted by Blade Magazine. The event has over 1,000 exhibitors and is the host for inductees into the annual Cutlery Hall of Fame. It also hosts the annual Blade HQ Balisong Competition, BladeSports International Cutting World Championships, Blade University, Knife of the Year Awards, and a variety of knifemaking classes and demos. The event takes place every year over the course of several days and brings in knifemakers and knife companies from all parts of world.

History
The first Blade Show was held in 1982 as the American Blade Convention and Show in Cincinnati, Ohio. The magazine who hosted the show was known as 'American Blade' at the time. In 1983 it became known as "The American Blade Collector's Show". In 1984 the name became "The Blade Super Show". In 1986 the show relocated to Knoxville, Tennessee. In 1988, the name was changed to the Blade Show & Cutlery Fair and it became loosely referred to as the Blade Show. In 1993 the show moved to Atlanta, Georgia and officially became known as Blade Show hosted by BLADE Magazine. In 2018, the show went under the ownership of Caribou Media Group.

Cutlery Hall of Fame
Every year, the Blade Show admits a new person into the "Cutlery Hall of Fame".  The Cutlery Hall of Fame is composed of knifemakers, authors and persons who promote knife making, Bladesmithing, and Knife collecting.  Each year, the living members of the Cutlery Hall Of Fame nominate and vote on the latest inductee to join their ranks.
Henry D. Baer - Knifemaker, President of Schrade Knives and namesake of the "Uncle Henry" brand of pocketknives.
Dewey Ferguson - Author
Bo Randall - Knifemaker 
James B. Lile - Knifemaker 
 M.H. Cole - Knifemaker and Author 
 Al Buck - Founder of Buck Knives 
 William R. Williamson - Scholar and collector of Bowie knives
 Pete Gerber - Founder of Gerber Legendary Blades
 Bob Loveless - Knifemaker
 William F. Moran -  Bladesmith
 Jim Parker - Knifemaker
 George Herron - Knifemaker  1932-2007
 Frank Buster - Knifemaker
 Frank Forsyth
 A.G. Russell - Knifemaker
 Ken Warner - Author    
 Jim Bowie - Father of the Bowie knife
 Maury Shavin
 Hubert Lawell
 William Scagel - Knifemaker  
 Gil Hibben - Knifemaker
 Harry McEvoy - Author
 Buster Warenski - Knifemaker      
 Albert M. Baer - Founder of Schrade Knives
 Col. Rex Applegate - Knife designer, author    
 B.R. Hughes - Author
 Bruce Voyles - Author    
 Bernard Levine - Author    
 Houston Price - Author
 Bill Adams - Author    
 Jim Weyer - Author and photographer
 Chuck Buck - Knifemaker - Buck Knives
 Blackie Collins - Knifemaker 
 Frank Centofante - Knifemaker
 Ron Lake - Knifemaker
 Sal Glesser - Designer, Founder of Spyderco
 Joe Drouin - Knife Collector       
 Bob Schrimsher - Knifemaking Supply
 Rudy Ruana - Knifemaker  
 D¹Alton Holder - Knifemaker
 Michael Walker - Knifemaker, Inventor of the Walker linerlock
 George "Butch" Winter - Author
 Tim Leatherman - Inventor of the multi-tool knife and founder of Leatherman Tools
 Dan Dennehy - Knifemaker, Founding Member of the Knifemakers' Guild
 Ken Onion - Knifemaker and inventor of the SpeedSafe Mechanism
 Al Mar - Knifemaker, founder of Al Mar Knives
 Paul Bos - Master heat treater - Buck Knives
Carl Elsener III (2011) - Knifemaker - Victorinox
Kit Carson (2012) - Knifemaker
Wayne Goddard (2013) - Knifemaker and Author
Goldie Russell (2014) - Knifemaker
Chris Reeve (2015) - Knifemaker and inventor of the Integral Lock
CJ Buck (2016) - Knifemaker - Buck Knives
Jim Batson (2017) - Knifemaker - Benchmade Knive
Les de Asis (2017) - CEO - Benchmade Knife
Phil Lobred (2018) - Knife Collector
Dan Delavan (2018) - Knife Retailer - Founder California Custom Knife Show
Tony Bose (2019) - Knifemaker
Mel Pardue (2019) - Knifemaker
Steve Shackleford (2019) - Editor-in-Chief - Blade Magazine
Joe Keeslar (2020) - Knifemaker
Jim Sornberger (2020) - Knifemaker
Jay Hendrickson (2021) - Knifemaker
Beverly and Billy-Mace Imel (2021) - Knifemakers

See also
SHOT Show

References

Trade shows in the United States